Chenar (also Romanized as Chenār) is a village in Golmakan Rural District, Golbajar District, Chenaran County, Razavi Khorasan Province, Iran. At the 2006 census, its population was 161, in 52 families.

References 

Populated places in Chenaran County